George Hinson Mosley (born October 21, 1932) was an American politician. He was a member of the Georgia House of Representatives  from 1992 to 2006. He is a member of the Democratic party.

References

Living people
Democratic Party members of the Georgia House of Representatives
1932 births
21st-century American politicians